Bridges Branch is a  long tributary to Crabtree Creek in Wake County, North Carolina and is classed as a 1st order stream on the EPA waters geoviewer site.

Course
Bridges Branch is the smallest named tributary to Crabtree Creek and rises in eastern Raleigh, North Carolina near St. Augustines College then flows northeast through Lions Park to meet Crabtree Creek just downstream of Pigeon House Branch.  About 4% of the watershed is forested with the rest being developed.

Watershed
Bridges Branch drains  of Raleigh Gneiss geology.  The watershed receives an average of 46.7 in/year of precipitation and has a wetness index of 426.39.

See also
List of rivers of North Carolina

External links
 Lions Park (City of Raleigh)

References

Rivers of North Carolina
Rivers of Wake County, North Carolina
Tributaries of Pamlico Sound